The Valuer General of New South Wales oversees the land valuation system of New South Wales.

The Valuer General is responsible for standards and policy in relation to the land valuation system and determining compensation for the acquisition of properties and monitors the quality of the value of land and services to the community by Property NSW. The Office of the Valuer General provides day-to-day support to the Valuer General. The Valuer General reports administratively to the Minister for Lands and Water and the Secretary of the Department of Planning and Environment. Since 20 January 2020, the Office of the Valuer General and Valuation Services (a division of Property NSW) were merged to form Valuer General NSW (VG NSW).

The incumbent Valuer General, Dr David Parker, was appointed on 20 January 2020.

Joint Standing Committee on the Office of the Valuer General 
The Joint Committee on the Office of the Valuer General of the Parliament of New South Wales scrutinises the work done by the Valuer General and their office.

List of Valuers General

References 

 Government of New South Wales
 Government agencies of New South Wales
 1916 establishments in Australia
Valuers general